The 1954 USC Trojans football team represented the University of Southern California (USC) in the 1954 college football season. In their fourth year under head coach Jess Hill, the Trojans compiled an 8–4 record (6–1 against conference opponents), finished in second place in the Pacific Coast Conference, lost to Ohio State in the 1955 Rose Bowl, and outscored their opponents by a combined total of 258 to 159.

Jim Contratto led the team in passing with 32 of 79 passes completed for 702 yards, five touchdowns and five interceptions. Jon Arnett led the team in rushing with 96 carries for 601 yards and seven touchdowns. Lindon Crow was the leading receiver with seven catches for 274 yards and three touchdowns.

Three Trojans received first-team honors from the Associated Press on the 1954 All-Pacific Coast Conference football team: back Lindon Crow; tackle Ed Fouch; guard Jim Salsbury.

Schedule

Game summaries

UCLA

Players
 Jon Arnett, sophomore tailback (#26), earned second-team All-Coast honors from the UP
 Al Barry, senior right guard
 George Belotti, tackle
 Bing Bordier, right end
 Ron Brown
 Ron Calabria, wingback
 Leon Clarke, left end, second-team All-Coast honors from coaches
 Frank Clayton, left halfback
 Jim Contratto, quarterback
 Lindon Crow, second-team All-Coast (co-captain)
 Aramis Dandoy, tailback, won All-Coast honors from INS
 Mario DaRe, tackle
 Jim Decker, fullback
 Gordon Duvall, fullback
 Dirk Eldredge, center
 Dick Enright, right guard
 Orlando Ferrante, guard, first-team All-Coast honors from coaches, second-string All-Coast honors from INS
 Ed Fouch, right tackle, first-team All-Coast (co-captain)
 George Galli, guard
 Marv Goux, linebacker, led the team in defensive statistics
 Chuck Greenwood, right end
 Chuck Griffith, right end
 Frank Hall, back
 Roger Hooks quarterback
 Bob Isaacson, guard
 Chuck Leimbach, end
 Don McFarland, end
 Ernie Merk, back
 John Miller, guard
 Frank Pavich, guard and tackle
 Vern Sampson, center
 Irwin Spector, guard, Brooklyn, New York
 Joe Tisdale, fullback
 Sam Tsagalakis, placekicker

Coaching staff and other personnel
 Head coach: Jess Hill
 Assistant coaches: Mel Hein (line coach - centers and tackles), Don Clark (line coach - guards and defensive patterns), Bill Fisk (ends), George Ceithaml (backfield coach), Nick Pappas (defensive backs), Jess Mortensen (freshman coach)
 Yell kings: Don Ward, Jerry Stolp, Phil Reilly, Shep Aparicio, Bob Mandel
 Manager: Peter Couden

References

USC
USC Trojans football seasons
USC Trojans football